Rundle Station is a CTrain light rail station in Calgary, Alberta. It is a stop on the Northeast Line (Route 202) and opened on April 27, 1985, as part of the original line.

The station is located in the median of 36 Street NE, to the north of the intersection of 20 Avenue NE/Rundlehorn Drive, right in front of Sunridge Mall.  The station is 8.4 km from the City Hall Interlocking.  Pedestrian overpasses connect the station to both sides of 36 Street NE. Stairs, escalators, as well as an elevator provide access down to the centre-loading platform.

The station serves Rundle and the Sunridge Mall with 350 parking spaces are included across the station.

As part of Calgary Transit's plan to operate 4-car trains by the end of 2014, all 3-car platforms are being extended. In addition to a platform extension, Rundle station had upgraded station furnishings installed. Construction was completed in Fall 2013.

In 2005, the station registered and average transit of 11,600 boardings per weekday.

On January 20, 1993, a 4-year-old child, Michael MacIntosh, got his jacket sleeve stuck at the bottom of the escalator after straying from his family. Bystanders helped him stay conscious until paramedics arrived and free his injured left arm, this was later seen on Rescue 911 on May 4, 1993, on CBS.

Crime 
Rundle Station has been criticized for being a crime hotspot in the Calgary C-Train System. On a CityNews interview in January 2022 with Calgary Transit Lead Staff 'Stephen Tauro', it was listed as one of the 5 stations with an unusually high crime rate. The others being: Marlborough, Southland, Heritage and Sunalta Stations.

References

CTrain stations
1985 establishments in Alberta
Railway stations in Canada opened in 1985